The 1932 San Diego Marines Devil Dogs football team (also known as the West Coast Marines) represented the Marine Corps Recruit Depot San Diego during the 1932 college football season. Following a fairly successful 1931 season, the Devil Dogs lost five of their final six games and finished with a 4–6 record.

Schedule

References

San Diego Marines Devil Dogs football team
San Diego Marines